Kromdraai is a town in Sekhukhune District Municipality in the Limpopo province of South Africa.

See also
 Kromdraai Conservancy
 Kromdraai fossil site

References

Populated places in the Ephraim Mogale Local Municipality